The Vanderbilt Cup was the first major trophy in American auto racing.

History
An international event, it was founded by William Kissam Vanderbilt II in 1904 and first held on October 8 on a course set out in Nassau County on Long Island, New York. The announcement that the race was to be held caused considerable controversy in New York, bringing a flood of legal actions in an attempt to stop the race.  The politicians soon jumped in, holding public hearings on the issue. Vanderbilt prevailed and the inaugural race was run over a  course of winding dirt roads through the Nassau County area.

Vanderbilt put up a large cash prize hoping to encourage American manufacturers to get into racing, a sport already well organized in Europe that was yielding many factory improvements to motor vehicle technology. The race drew the top drivers and their vehicles from across the Atlantic Ocean, some of whom had competed in Europe's Gordon Bennett Cup. The first Long Island race featured seventeen vehicles and the newspaper and poster art promotion drew large crowds hoping to see an American car defeat the mighty European vehicles. However, George Heath won the race in a Panhard and another French vehicle, a Darracq, took the Cup the next two years straight.  Crowd control was a problem from the start and after a spectator, Curt Gruner, was killed in 1906, the race was cancelled. Meanwhile, in France, the first Grand Prix motor racing event had been run on June 26, 1906, under the auspices of the Automobile Club de France in Le Mans. One of the competitors was American Elliot Shepard, the son of Margaret Vanderbilt-Shepard and a cousin of William Kissam Vanderbilt.

Learning from his cousin about the success of the French Grand Prix and the rapid expansion of Grand Prix racing in other European countries, William Vanderbilt conceived a way to solve the safety issue as well as improve attendance to his race. Vanderbilt formed a company to build the Long Island Motor Parkway, one of the country's first modern paved parkways that could not only be used for the race but would open up Long Island for easy access and economic development. The 1908 race was held over parts of the new highway and much to the delight of the large crowd on hand, 23-year-old local hero George Robertson from Garden City, New York became the first American to win the event driving the American Locomobile, which was the company's first gas-powered car and designed by famed engineer Andrew L. Riker (built in Bridgeport, Connecticut) (in 1908, George Robertson (wearing #16) took the win in this car, ahead of fellow Locomobile pilot Joe Florida in third, becoming the first United States-built car to win in international competition).

The Vanderbilt Cup was held successfully on Long Island until 1911 when it was showcased at Savannah, Georgia in combination with the American Grand Prize. The next year it moved to a racecourse in Milwaukee, Wisconsin, then for three years in California: Santa Monica in 1914 and 1916, San Francisco in 1915. The race was canceled after the United States joined the Allies in World War I in 1917. Some of the drivers who participated in the Vanderbilt Cup became famous names, synonymous with automobiles and racing such as Louis Chevrolet, Vincenzo Lancia and Ralph DePalma.

The Vanderbilt Cup was not held again until 1936 when William Kissam Vanderbilt II's nephew, George Washington Vanderbilt III picked up the cause and sponsored a  race at the new facilities at Roosevelt Raceway. Once again, the Europeans were enticed by the substantial prize money and Scuderia Ferrari entered three Alfa Romeo racers. A lack of American competition and a less-than-exciting course layout saw the race run for only two years, both won by Europeans.

The Vanderbilt Cup would not return to the United States motor racing scene for more than twenty years. In 1960, sponsored by Cornelius Vanderbilt IV, it was run as a Formula Junior event and held again at Roosevelt Raceway.  In 1965, 1967, and 1968, the Bridgehampton Sports Car Races were billed as the Vanderbilt Cup.

Trophies
The original Cup is cast of silver and measures 2.5 feet (0.76 m) in height. It bears the image of William K. Vanderbilt II driving his record-setting Mercedes at the Daytona Beach Road Course in 1904.  The trophy today is stored at a Smithsonian Institution storage facility and is not available to be seen by the public.

The George Vanderbilt Cup is on display at Museo Nicolis in Verona.

Race winners

 The 1966 event was billed as the "Bridgehampton 200".

Revival trophy
The Vanderbilt Cup name disappeared for another 28 years until 1996. In recognition of William Kissam Vanderbilt's place in automotive racing history, a copy of the original cup was created as the trophy for the CART U.S. 500 race. In 2000, CART designated the Vanderbilt Cup as its series championship trophy. Names of U.S. 500 winners from 1996 to 1999 and the CART series winners since 2000, are etched into the new Cup.

With the bankruptcy of Champ Car and purchase of the assets by the IRL, Tony George has mentioned interest in using the Vanderbilt Cup as the Series Championship Trophy for the IndyCar Series. However, the Astor Cup has been used since the 2011 season.

References

External links

Vanderbilt Cup Race Series - EMRA - EASTERN MOTOR RACING ASSOCIATION - Owners of the "Vanderbilt Cup" service mark
Vanderbilt Cup Races
22 October 1904;The Vanderbilt International. Cup Contest